Chouaib Debbih (born January 1, 1993) is an Algerian footballer who plays for MC Alger in the Algerian Ligue Professionnelle 1.

Career
In 2018, Debbih signed a contract with ES Setif.
In 2021, he signed a contract with CS Constantine.
In 2022, Chouaib Debbih signed a contract with MC Alger.

References

External links

Living people
1993 births
Algerian footballers
AS Aïn M'lila players
ES Sétif players
CA Batna players
Association football midfielders
21st-century Algerian people
Algeria A' international footballers
2022 African Nations Championship players